Limedale is an unincorporated community in Greencastle Township, Putnam County, in the U.S. state of Indiana.

History
Limedale was laid out in 1864, and named for the lime quarries in the area. A post office called Limedale was established in 1873, and remained in operation until it was discontinued in 1909.

Geography

References

Unincorporated communities in Putnam County, Indiana
Unincorporated communities in Indiana